Shaheen Shah Afridi (Urdu,; born 6 April 2000) is a Pakistani professional cricketer who plays as a fast bowler for the Pakistan national cricket team and captains PSL franchise Lahore Qalandars . He is regarded as one of the best bowlers in contemporary world cricket across all formats. Under his leadership, Lahore Qalandars won their first PSL title in the 2022 season and again went on to win the 2023 season, becoming the first team in PSL history to successfully defend their title.

Personal life
In March 2021, Afridi got engaged to Shahid Afridi's daughter Ansha Afridi.

In July 2022, Afridi was made an honorary Deputy Superintendent of the Police (DSP) rank in the KPK Police as a goodwill ambassador.

In January 2023, it was announced that Afridi would design Lahore Qalandars' new kits for the 2023 PSL.

On 3 February 2023, he married Ansha Afridi in a private nikah ceremony.

Early life and career
Afridi belongs to the Zakhakhel Afridi tribe of the Pashtuns. He grew up in Landi Kotal, a town in Khyber District, Pakistan, on the border with Afghanistan. He is the youngest of seven brothers; his eldest brother, 15 years his senior, is Riaz Afridi who played a solitary Test match for Pakistan in 2004. Shaheen started his cricket career from the Tatara Ground in Landi Kotal, which is named after the nearby Tatara hills.

Riaz Afridi introduced Shaheen to hard-ball cricket at the FATA Under-16 trials in 2015, with Shaheen having played only tennis-ball cricket until then. Success at this level led to Shaheen being selected for the Under-16 tour of Australia in November 2015, where he played his part with four wickets in the 2–1 victories in the One-Day and Twenty20 series.

Domestic and T20 career
In December 2016, Afridi was included in the Pakistan Under-19 cricket team selected for the 2016 Under-19 Asia Cup held in Sri Lanka. He took 3 wickets for 27 runs in Pakistan's nine wickets win over Singapore in their opening match of the U-19 Asia Cup.

In early September 2017, Afridi signed a two-year contract with Dhaka Dynamites, a major Bangladesh Premier League franchise. Later he made his first-class debut for Khan Research Laboratories in the 2017–18 Quaid-e-Azam Trophy on 26 September 2017. In the second innings of the match, he took 8 wickets for 39 runs, the best figures by a Pakistani bowler on first-class debut.

In December 2017, Afridi was named in Pakistan's squad for the 2018 Under-19 Cricket World Cup. He was the leading wicket-taker for Pakistan in the tournament, with 12 wickets. Following Pakistan's matches in the tournament, the International Cricket Council (ICC) named Afridi as the rising star of the squad.

Afridi made his Twenty20 debut for Lahore Qalandars in the 2018 Pakistan Super League (PSL) on 23 February 2018. The following month in the PSL, during Lahore's match with the Multan Sultans, Afridi took five wickets for four runs. Lahore won the fixture by 6 wickets and Afridi was named the player of the match.

In April 2018, Afridi was named in Baluchistan's squad for the 2018 Pakistan Cup. He made his List A debut for Baluchistan on 25 April 2018.

In July 2019, Afridi was selected to play for the Rotterdam Rhinos in the inaugural edition of the Euro T20 Slam cricket tournament. However, the following month the tournament was cancelled.

In December 2019, it was announced that Afridi will play for Hampshire County Cricket Club in the 2020 t20 Blast in England. In September 2020, Hampshire confirmed his participation in the 2020 t20 Blast, and announced that he will be available after fulfilling his national duties.

On 20 September 2020, in the final round of group matches in the t20 Blast, Afridi took a hat-trick and four wickets in four balls, finishing with match figures of 6/19 from his four overs and recording the best ever bowling figures at the Rose Bowl in T20 cricket.

On 2 October 2020, in the 2020–21 National T20 Cup, Afridi took his second five-wicket haul in three T20 games, with figures of 5/20 from his four overs. Three days later, Afridi took another five-wicket haul, with 5/21 in the match against Sindh. In October 2021, Afridi signed with Middlesex to play in domestic matches in England until July 2022. However, he returned to Pakistan in mid-May to prepare for the national team's home series against the West Indies.

In December 2021, he was named as a captain of Lahore Qalandars. Under his captaincy, Qalandars won the 2022 PSL which also made him the youngest captain to win a T20 league. He also ended as leading wicket-taker of the tournament.

International career

In March 2018, he was named in Pakistan's Twenty20 International (T20I) squad for their series against the West Indies. He made his T20I debut for Pakistan against the West Indies on 3 April 2018. In September 2018, he was named in Pakistan's One Day International (ODI) squad for the 2018 Asia Cup.  He made his ODI debut for Pakistan against Afghanistan on 21 September 2018.

In November 2018, he was named in Pakistan's Test squad for their series against New Zealand. He made his Test debut for Pakistan against New Zealand on 3 December 2018.

In April 2019, he was named in Pakistan's squad for the 2019 Cricket World Cup. On 5 July 2019, in the match against Bangladesh, Shaheen became the youngest bowler to take a five-wicket haul in a World Cup match, finishing with figures of 6/35. These were also the best bowling figures by a bowler for Pakistan in a World Cup match. Following the World Cup, the International Cricket Council (ICC) named Afridi as the rising star of the squad.

In December 2019, during the second Test match against Sri Lanka, Afridi took his first five-wicket haul in Test cricket.

In June 2020, he was named in a 29-man squad for Pakistan's tour to England during the COVID-19 pandemic. In July, he was shortlisted in Pakistan's 20-man squad for the Test matches against England. In September 2021, he was named in Pakistan's squad for the 2021 ICC Men's T20 World Cup.

In January 2022, Afridi was named the Cricketer of the Year by the International Cricket Council. He took 78 wickets in 36 international matches in 2021.

Awards
 PCB's Impactful performance of the year: 2021
 ICC Men's cricketer of the Year, 2021.

References

External links
 
 Shaheen Afridi at Pakistan Cricket Board

2000 births
Afridi people
Baluchistan cricketers
Cricketers at the 2019 Cricket World Cup
Dhaka Dominators cricketers
Hampshire cricketers
Khan Research Laboratories cricketers
Lahore Qalandars cricketers
Living people
Middlesex cricketers
Pakistani cricketers
Pakistan Test cricketers
Pakistan One Day International cricketers
Pakistan Twenty20 International cricketers
Pashtun people
People from Khyber District
International Cricket Council Cricketer of the Year